Ranch to Market Road 473 (RM 473) is a ranch to market road in Kendall and Blanco counties in the U.S. state of Texas.

Route description
RM 473 begins in Comfort, at an intersection with SH 27. The route travels through the business district of Comfort, intersecting  Business US 87. RM 473 then passes under I-10/US 87, but there is no direct junction with the freeway. Outside of Comfort, RM 473 continues eastward to Sisterdale, where it has a brief concurrency with RM 1376. It continues eastward through Kendalia and intersects US 281 south of Twin Sisters. The two routes stay merged for about two miles; US 281 continues north while RM 473 resumes a generally eastbound direction. RM 473 ends at an intersection with RM 32.

History
The route was originally designated as Farm to Market Road 473 (FM 473) on July 9, 1945, as a short route connecting US 87 in Comfort to Nichols Ranch  to the east. The designation was changed from an FM to RM route on October 1, 1956. The addition of the section between US 281 and RM 32 occurred on November 26, 1969. While the official designation has not been amended, signage indicates that the route begins at SH 27, and not at US 87 (or its successor business route).

Major intersections
The total mileage in the table below is greater than that given by TxDOT, because the concurrency with US 281 is not included in its official description or mileage; however, the route is signed as concurrent.

References

0473
Transportation in Kendall County, Texas
Transportation in Blanco County, Texas